Edgars Rinkēvičs (born 21 September 1973 in Jūrmala) is a Latvian public official and politician, currently serving as the Minister of Foreign Affairs of Latvia, a role he has held since 2011. Before beginning in this role, he served as head of the Chancery of the President of Latvia, as State Secretary of the Ministry of Defence, as well as a deputy of the Saeima.

Having previously represented Latvian Way and the Reform Party, he has been a member of the Unity party since May 2014.

Early life and education
Rinkēvičs was born in Jūrmala, where he completed high school in 1991. Upon graduating from high school, he started a bachelor's degree at the University of Latvia's Faculty of History and Philosophy, which he acquired in 1995. During the same time, in 1994 and 1995 he studied Political Science and International Relations at the University of Groningen in the Netherlands, for which he received a certificate in 1995. In 1997, he obtained his master's degree in political science, followed by a second master's degree from the Dwight D. Eisenhower School for National Security and Resource Strategy, obtained in 2000.

Career
In 1993 and 1994, Rinkēvičs worked as a journalist reporting on foreign policy and international relations at Latvian Radio, while still studying. In 1995, he took the job as senior referent in the Policy Department of the Ministry of Defence, a role he held until March 1996, when he became acting leader of the Policy Department, a role he occupied until September the same year, when he was made acting Deputy Secretary of State for Defence. In May 1997, he became acting Secretary of State for Defence, before coming the main Secretary of State for Defence in August 1997, a role he possessed until October 2008.

Between 1998 and 2004, Rinkēvičs was a member of the Latvian Way party. In February 1998, he became involved in discussion on the US-Baltic Partnership Charter, and from 2002 to 2003 was a member of the Latvian delegation negotiating accession to NATO as Latvia's Deputy Head of Delegation. In 2008, he was appointed as Head of the Chancery of the President of Latvia, a role he held until July 2011. In October of the same year, Rinkēvičs joined Valdis Dombrovskis' third cabinet as Minister of Foreign Affairs. Initially an independent, he joined the Zatlers' Reform Party in January 2012.

Following the resignation of the Dombrovskis cabinet in 2014, he continued his ministerial roles in Laimdota Straujuma's first cabinet. In 2014 he stood in the parliamentary elections and was elected to parliament before again being confirmed to serve as Minister of Foreign Affairs, this time in Straujuma's second cabinet. He served as Minister of Foreign Affairs from 2016 to 2019 in the Kučinskis cabinet and since 2019 in the Kariņš cabinet.

In May 2014, Rinkēvičs joined the Unity party.

Political positions 
Rinkēvičs said he welcomed the news about the establishment of full diplomatic relations between Israel and Bahrain.

Rinkēvičs expressed deep concern over the escalation of hostilities in the disputed region of Nagorno-Karabakh and called on Armenia and Azerbaijan to immediately halt fighting and progress towards a peaceful resolution.

Personal life 
On 6 November 2014, he publicly announced on his Twitter profile that he is gay, making him the first lawmaker in Latvia to announce his homosexuality, as well as the most prominent openly gay politician in a former Soviet Bloc state at the time. In addition to Latvian, he is fluent in English, Russian, and French.

See also

List of foreign ministers in 2021
List of current foreign ministers

Notes

References

External links 

 

1973 births
Living people
People from Jūrmala
Latvian Way politicians
Reform Party (Latvia) politicians
New Unity politicians
Ministers of Foreign Affairs of Latvia
Deputies of the 12th Saeima
Deputies of the 13th Saeima
Deputies of the 14th Saeima
Gay politicians
Gay diplomats
Latvian LGBT politicians
Commanders of the Order of Merit of the Republic of Poland
Recipients of the Order of the Cross of Terra Mariana, 3rd Class
Recipients of the Order of the Cross of Terra Mariana, 2nd Class
Recipients of the Order of the Cross of Terra Mariana, 1st Class